Sydney railway station usually refers to Central railway station, Sydney in Sydney, Australia. Other uses include:
 The Sydney Parade railway station in Dublin, Ireland.
 The railway station in Sydney, Nova Scotia

See also 
 North Sydney railway station